Gordon Fergus-Thompson FRCM (born 9 March 1952) is an English concert pianist.

Biography
Fergus-Thompson's first piano teacher was Christine Brown, a pupil of Denis Matthews. Subsequently, he became a student of Gordon Green at the Royal Northern College of Music. Later, he studied with Alexis Weissenberg and John Ogdon and was a student of Peter Katin at the Royal College of Music.

His debut concert took place at the Wigmore Hall in 1976.

Fergus-Thompson has been a professor of piano at the Royal College of Music since 1996. He was awarded a FRCM in May 2010. He has given masterclasses throughout the UK, USA, Australia and the Far East.

Fergus-Thompson has performed as soloist with the Philharmonia Orchestra, English Chamber Orchestra, City of Birmingham Symphony Orchestra, Royal Liverpool Philharmonic, Hallé Orchestra, Bournemouth Symphony Orchestra, the BBC Symphony Orchestra, the Gothenburg Symphony Orchestra and the Residentie Orchestra. Conductors under whose baton he has performed include Evgenii Svetlanov, Jacek Kaspszyk, Sir Edward Downes, Helmut Muller-Bruhl, Moshe Atzmon, David Atherton and Sir Charles Groves. He has given over two hundred broadcast recitals on BBC Radio 3.

His recordings include Bach transcriptions, the complete works of Ravel (2 vols, 1992), the complete works of Debussy (5 vols 1989, winner solo instrumental section Music Retailers Association (MRA) awards 1991), the complete works of Scriabin (1990) (Vol 1 with Sonatas 4, 5, 9 and 10 and Studies Opus 42, was winner of the solo instrumental section MRA awards 1992).

References

External links
Debretts' entry for Gordon Fergus-Thompson, Esq.
Official website of Gordon Fergus-Thompson

1952 births
Living people
English classical pianists
Male classical pianists
Alumni of the Royal College of Music
Fellows of the Royal College of Music
Alumni of the Royal Northern College of Music
Academics of the Royal College of Music
21st-century classical pianists
21st-century British male musicians